Samuel Crocker Cobb (May 22, 1826 – February 18, 1891) was a businessman and politician who served on the city councils of the cities Roxbury, Massachusetts and Boston, Massachusetts and who served three consecutive terms as the Mayor of Boston.

Early life 
Cobb was born May 22, 1826, in Taunton, Massachusetts to David George Washington Cobb and Abby (Crocker) Cobb.

Family life 
On November 21, 1848, Cobb married Aurelia L. Beattie, in Belfast, Maine. Aurelia was the third daughter of William and Jane I. Beattie of East Thomaston, Maine.

Cobb's election as mayor 
Cobb was elected mayor in November 1873.

Cobb's mayoralty 
Cobb opposed creating jobs for the unemployed after the Panic of 1873, declaring the idea "subversive to our whole social fabric, tending directly to communism in its worst form."

The event of greatest historical interest during Mayor Cobb's administration was the celebration of the one hundredth anniversary of the Battle of Bunker Hill. It is related that on this occasion many men who had taken leading parts in the war of the rebellion, both Unionists and Confederates, met for the first time in peace.
Cobb was a member of the Society of the Cincinnati

See also 
 Timeline of Boston, 1860s-1870s

References

Further reading 
 Bugbee. "Memoir of Hon. Samuel Crocker Cobb". Proceedings of the Massachusetts Historical Society, 1892.

Mayors of Boston
Massachusetts city council members
19th-century American people
Politicians from Taunton, Massachusetts
1826 births
1891 deaths
Massachusetts Whigs
19th-century American politicians